Karsten Huck (born 13 November 1945) is a German equestrian and Olympic medalist. He was born in Wohltorf. He won a bronze medal in show jumping at the 1988 Summer Olympics in Seoul.

References

External links

1945 births
Living people
German male equestrians
Olympic equestrians of West Germany
Olympic bronze medalists for West Germany
Equestrians at the 1988 Summer Olympics
Sportspeople from Schleswig-Holstein
Olympic medalists in equestrian
People from Herzogtum Lauenburg
Medalists at the 1988 Summer Olympics